The following species in the genus Sorbus, many of which are called rowans or mountain-ashes, are recognised by Plants of the World Online:

Sorbus admonitor 
Sorbus albopilosa 
Sorbus americana 
Sorbus amoena 
Sorbus arachnoidea 
Sorbus aria 
Sorbus arranensis 
Sorbus arvonensis 
Sorbus aucuparia 
Sorbus x avonensis 
Sorbus bissetii 
Sorbus bulleyana 
Sorbus californica 
Sorbus cambrensis 
Sorbus carmesina 
Sorbus cashmiriana 
Sorbus cibagouensis 
Sorbus cinereopubescens 
Sorbus commixta 
Sorbus coxii 
Sorbus cuneifolia 
Sorbus decora 
Sorbus discolor 
Sorbus dolichofoliolatus 
Sorbus domestica 
Sorbus domugledica 
Sorbus eburnea 
Sorbus ellipsoidalis 
Sorbus eminentiformis 
Sorbus esserteauiana 
Sorbus fansipanensis 
Sorbus faohraei 
Sorbus filipes 
Sorbus foliolosa 
Sorbus forrestii 
Sorbus frutescens 
Sorbus gilgitana 
Sorbus glabriuscula 
Sorbus glomerulata 
Sorbus gonggashanica 
Sorbus gongshanensis 
Sorbus gracilis 
Sorbus hajastana 
Sorbus helenae 
Sorbus herculis 
Sorbus himalaica 
Sorbus x houstoniae 
Sorbus hugh-mcallisteri 
Sorbus hupehensis 
Sorbus insignis 
Sorbus intermedia 
Sorbus keenanii 
Sorbus khumbuensis 
Sorbus kiukiangensis 
Sorbus koehneana 
Sorbus kongboensis 
Sorbus kurzii 
Sorbus kusnetzovii 
Sorbus lanpingensis 
Sorbus leighensis 
Sorbus lingshiensis 
Sorbus longii 
Sorbus lushanensis 
Sorbus macallisteri 
Sorbus macrantha 
Sorbus maderensis 
Sorbus margaretae 
Sorbus matsumurana 
Sorbus microphylla 
Sorbus monbeigii 
Sorbus x motleyi 
Sorbus muliensis 
Sorbus obsoletidentata 
Sorbus occidentalis 
Sorbus oligodonta 
Sorbus olivacea 
Sorbus ovalis 
Sorbus parva 
Sorbus parvifolia 
Sorbus parvifructa 
Sorbus pontica 
Sorbus poteriifolia 
Sorbus prattii 
Sorbus × proctoriana 
Sorbus x proctoris 
Sorbus pseudofennica 
Sorbus pseudohupehensis 
Sorbus pseudomeinichii 
Sorbus pseudovilmorinii 
Sorbus randaiensis 
Sorbus reducta 
Sorbus rehderiana 
Sorbus rinzenii 
Sorbus x robertsonii 
Sorbus rockii 
Sorbus rosea 
Sorbus rubescens 
Sorbus rufopilosa 
Sorbus rupicola 
Sorbus rushforthii 
Sorbus rutilans 
Sorbus sambucifolia 
Sorbus sargentiana 
Sorbus scalaris 
Sorbus scannelliana 
Sorbus scopulina 
Sorbus setschwanensis 
Sorbus shirinensis 
Sorbus sitchensis 
Sorbus splendens 
Sorbus stirtoniana 
Sorbus subfusca 
Sorbus sujoyi 
Sorbus tenuis 
Sorbus tianschanica 
Sorbus tiantangensis 
Sorbus tiliifolia 
Sorbus torminalis 
Sorbus ulleungensis 
Sorbus ursina 
Sorbus vilmorinii 
Sorbus wallichii 
Sorbus wilsoniana 
Sorbus × yokouchii 
Sorbus zayuensis

References

Sorbus